Teesside International Airport , previously Durham Tees Valley Airport, is an international airport located between Darlington and Stockton-on-Tees, Northern England. The airport serves the North East, primarily Teesside, County Durham and North Yorkshire.

The airport has a Civil Aviation Authority (CAA) Public Use Aerodrome Licence (number P518) that allows flights for the public transport of passengers and for flight instruction. Tees Valley Combined Authority owns three-quarters of the airport and Teesside Airport Foundation owns the remainder.

Originally Royal Air Force (RAF) station Middleton St George, the aerodrome became Tees-Side Airport in 1964, Teesside International Airport in 1987, and Durham Tees Valley Airport in 2004 before reverting to Teesside International Airport in 2019 following a poll indicating 93% of locals preferred the name, with the change occurring on 25 July 2019. 'Teesside Airport' was common on local road signs that were either placed before 2004 or on signs with limited space for the then airport title.

History

RAF Middleton St George

The aerodrome began life in January 1941 as Royal Air Force Station Middleton St. George or RAF Goosepool as known to the locals (though it has never officially held that name). It was the most northerly of all Bomber Command airfields, home to both RAF and Royal Canadian Air Force squadrons during WWII, and exclusively RAF post-war. Bombing missions from the station included those to Berlin, Hanover, Kassel, Mannheim and Munich. Of the many military aircraft based at the aerodrome, it is best known as home to the Avro Lancaster during the war and English Electric Lightning in the 1960s. In 1957, the runway was extended to its current length of 7,516 ft (2,291m). The RAF station was closed in 1964 and the airfield sold to the Ministry of Civil Aviation.

Tees-Side Airport

The former RAF Station was then developed into a civil airport. The first civilian flight from the newly named Tees-Side Airport took place on 18 April 1964 with a Mercury Airlines service to Manchester. On 1 November 1966, the international passenger terminal was opened by Princess Margaretha of Sweden.

The IATA code for the new airport was determined as MME, however the meaning of this is disputed. Long term employees and tenants from the 1960s claim Middleton St George AerodroME, but because of the lack of certainty, the current management have unofficially adopted Middleton Military Establishment as a nod to the military origins. Middlesbrough Municipal AerodromE is also often quoted. However the latter seems unlikely as the Airport is actually located in Darlington County Durham.

In the early days the airport developed a network of mainly scheduled routes, with limited inclusive tour charter flights. The destinations were consistent but the airlines were not, with British Midland, BKS Air Transport, Dan-Air, Autair and Channel Airways all coming and going before the turn of the decade. In November 1969 British Midland returned when they were awarded the licence to fly the London Heathrow route, which they continued operating until 28 March 2009.

The 1970s saw a decline in regional services but a growth in holiday flights, courtesy of Northeast Airlines (a rebranded BKS Air Transport) and Britannia Airways, as well as overseas operators such as Aviaco, Spantax and Aviogenex amongst others.

On 19 October 1971 the Teesside Airport railway station opened, with a shuttle bus running between the station and the terminal.

In 1974, the shares were divided between the newly formed Cleveland and Durham County Councils. Also during the year, the CAA declared Tees-Side should be the primary airport for the North East of England, ultimately however Newcastle International Airport prospered.

The 1980s saw scheduled routes resurge thanks to home-grown airline Casair Aviation Services, who had started out as an air taxi operator in 1972. In October 1982 Casair merged with Genair of Liverpool and Eastern Airways of Humberside (the airline of the same name still based there today is a phoenix company) under the Genair name, and one month later the first UK regional feeder franchise network was launched when Genair partnered with British Caledonian, trading under the British Caledonian Commuter Services banner. Unfortunately the new venture only lasted until July 1984 when Genair collapsed, causing the loss of 11 out of 18 routes for Tees-Side Airport. Luckily the airport valued the services more than owed fees, leading to Casair being reborn and taking over Genair services to Glasgow and Humberside, which they operated initially on behalf of Air Ecosse and then independently.

On 11 December 1982 the airport chartered Concorde for the day, it would visit twice more before its retirement, on 23 August 1986 for the air show and 30 April 1995.

Teesside International I
In 1987 the airport was privatised, with Cleveland and Durham local authorities retaining their shares. As part of this process the airport rebranded from Tees-Side Airport to Teesside International Airport.

1990 saw the one millionth aircraft movement at the airport, in the form of a British Midland service to London Heathrow. In 1996 when Cleveland County Council was abolished, the airport ownership was divided amongst local Borough Councils. Passenger numbers grew steadily from 1993 based upon an expanding holiday charter business.

In 1994 Airtours arrived on the scene and from 1997 based a summer seasonal aircraft at the airport, this coupled with other tour operator expansion propelled the airport to new heights.

In 2002 the airport sought a strategic partner to assist with future development and Peel Airports Ltd was selected as the preferred company, taking a 75% stake in the airport, to be increased to 89% after 10 years, with a commitment to invest £20m over the first five years.

Peel brought Teesside into the low cost era by securing bmibaby who based initially one, later two aircraft at the airport, ultimately giving the airport its peak years.

Durham Tees Valley
On 21 September 2004 the airport was renamed Durham Tees Valley Airport at the request of bmibaby, who felt the new name placed the airport better geographically as many of the airport's passengers, particularly those from outside the UK, were unfamiliar with the location of Teesside, whilst Durham was better known. The move was widely condemned by the local population who felt passionately about the name Teesside, and considered the term Tees Valley to be geographically inaccurate, as there is no such valley.

Shortly afterwards, a new access road, terminal front and terminal interior were completed, but the remainder of a planned £56 million expansion and development programme which would have enabled the airport to handle up to 3 million passengers annually never materialised due to falling passenger numbers after 2006.

In late summer 2006, bmibaby announced their surprise departure from Durham Tees Valley Airport. Peel were quick to replace them with Flyglobespan who opened an initial two-aircraft base.

Passenger numbers peaked in 2006 when the airport was used by 917,963 passengers. However, since the 2007-2008 financial crisis, numbers declined to 130,911 in 2017 before starting to rise again in 2018. A side effect of the crisis saw a number of airline bankruptcies or mergers, greatly reducing the number of potential operators for the airport to pursue. Those that merged consolidated at the larger regional airports, leading to the likes of Newcastle and Leeds expanding, whilst local airports such as Durham Tees Valley continued to struggle for several years.

In 2010, Vancouver Airport Services purchased a controlling 65% stake in Peel Airports Ltd and in December 2011, placed the airport up for sale. This led to the Peel Group purchasing their 75% share back on 10 February 2012 under a new subsidiary, Peel Investments (DTVA) Ltd.

In November 2010 the airport introduced the Passenger Facility Fee of £6 per adult to curb the airport's losses. Passengers must purchase a ticket from a machine before being allowed to proceed through security. Similar schemes were at the time already in place at other small English airports including Blackpool, Newquay and Norwich. Passenger numbers during 2011 were 15% lower compared to 2010.

On 11 January 2011, Ryanair left the airport after ending their service to Alicante Airport, having previously served Dublin Airport, Girona Airport and Rome Ciampino Airport. They decided to leave the airport before the introduction of the Passenger Facility Fee, being notoriously against such charges.

Other developments included new airfield lighting installed and during 2012, six-figure sums spent revamping the terminal building and renovating one of the World War II-era hangars.

On 30 October 2013, after it became clear the market wasn't going to yield any further charter flights, the airport announced it would no longer accept such flights as part of cost-cutting plans that will see the airport diversify into a business airport. The airport stated it would instead focus on scheduled routes and non-passenger related aviation such as cargo/general aviation. The news was part of a master plan for the airport site, including residential and commercial development, released in November 2013. Peel would later reverse the decision with the return of Balkan Holidays to Burgas for summer 2019, with further large scale expansion from two major holiday companies lined up, but stopped because of the 2018 takeover.

In November 2013, Peel Group released a master plan titled "Master Plan to 2020 and Beyond", covering the period up to 2050. This was followed up with a number of consultation events across the region with both the public and business community, the airport then took all feedback into consideration before releasing a final draft in April 2014.

Under the master plan, inclusive tour charter flights were axed as unprofitable. The cornerstone of the master plan was a housing estate which would have raised up to £30m to be reinvested back into the airport under a 'Section 106' agreement. This resulted in heavy opposition from the local public who misinterpreted the development as being at the expense of the airport, which had long been the subject of a conspiracy theory claiming the facility was being deliberately run down for closure. The houses were located on land too far removed from the existing airport infrastructure to be used for aviation development, and outline planning permission was received on 29 March 2017.

On 18 May 2017, Durham Tees Valley Airport announced significant investment to the airport's terminal facilities. Alongside extensive renovations in the departures area, improved retail services were introduced under the new in-house 'Xpress' brand. The first phase of investment was completed in September 2017, with the second phase starting in Autumn 2017. The airport's Privilege Membership Club also faced improvements for passenger service upgrades.

Later in May 2017, Durham Tees Valley Airport also introduced a new in-house ground handling service called Consort Aviation. Ground handling services are provided for general aviation, cargo and military aircraft.

During November 2017, the airport launched its Flying For The Future campaign to try and build support towards the airport and encourage more people to use the facility.

2018 takeover
On 4 December 2018, the Mayor of the Tees Valley Ben Houchen announced a £40 million deal had been agreed to buy Peel Airport's 89% majority shareholding in Durham Tees Valley Airport (made up of £35m for the airport and £5m for land with planning permission for 350 houses) which if approved would bring the airport back into public ownership for the first time since it was sold to Peel in 2003. Purchasing the airport was Houchen's primary election pledge in his campaign in the 2017 Tees Valley mayoral election. The deal would be completed subject to ratification from the leaders of the five local authorities that made up the Tees Valley Combined Authority who were to vote on the deal in January 2019 at a purpose emergency TVCA meeting called by the Mayor. An established airport operator thought to be the Stobart Aviation had been lined up to run the facility.

Should the Mayor's plan to buy back the airport be approved by TVCA, Houchen said he planned to give local residents the opportunity to decide whether to change the airport's name back to Teesside International Airport. An online poll was conducted in December 2018 with the option of continuing with the Durham Tees Valley name or reverting to the airport's former name of Teesside International. Of the 14,000 people who took part, 93% voted for the name to revert to Teesside International.

On 24 January 2019, the plan was unanimously voted in favour of by the six TVCA leaders, bringing the airport back under public ownership after 16 years in the private sector.

On 14 March 2019, the Mayor held a press conference at the airport confirming Stobart Aviation as the new airport operator. Stobart will invest in a 25% stake in the new holding company with the TVCA owning the majority 75% (it is expected that prior to this the individual local authority shares will be transferred across to the TVCA).

The takeover came at a time the airport was back on the rise, the 2017 terminal refurbishment was fuelling growth in passenger numbers, Peel had invested in a new £3.5m radar system which went live in 2021, and they had "one of the largest increases in flights at the airport since the financial crash in 2007" lined up from "two major holiday companies", which the Mayor blocked in favour of using the start-up subsidies on solicitors and consults for the takeover instead. The airport announced a new summer holiday route to Majorca for the 2020 summer season and the renewal of the 2019 Burgas route also for 2020.

Teesside International II
On 25 July 2019, the airport was rebranded back to Teesside International Airport, the name it operated under between 1987 and 2004.

In January 2020 flights to multiple destinations were announced by Eastern Airways to Belfast City, Cardiff, Dublin, Isle of Man, London City and Southampton, including a relaunch of their long established Aberdeen route. Routes to Newquay, Alicante and London Heathrow were later added, the latter for the first time in over a decade. By November, these routes were suspended due to the COVID-19 pandemic. A major global aircraft maintenance firm, Willis Lease Finance Corporation, were announced as a new tenant on 15 May 2020. They announced a £25m investment in the airport including two new hangars and a new Jet Centre facility on 18 July 2022. On 27 October 2020, TUI announced their return after nine years with a summer service to Majorca starting in May 2022. On 10 November 2020, Loganair announced flights to five destinations, all in competition with Eastern Airways, however Eastern never reinstated several of their routes following the pandemic leaving Loganair as the sole operator on most of them. On 25 November, Ryanair announced two flights a week to Palma de Mallorca and Alicante from June 2021. On 16 December 2020, a terminal refurbishment was announced including a second lounge, cafe and bar facilities, both landside and airside, as well as opening up previously closed areas.

In the 3 March 2021 annual Government budget announcement, the Tees Valley region was awarded Freeport status as well as Treasury North at Darlington (plus other departments announced since). Both expect to have long term benefits for the airport which is included as part of the freeport. On 23 April 2021, It was announced that the £6.00 passenger facility fee would be scrapped. On 12 May 2021 it was announced that duty-free shopping would return to the airport after an eight-year absence courtesy of World Duty-Free.

On 7 February 2022, new details of a proposed Teesside Airport business park were announced. The new business park, based on the southside of the airport, will include a new 1.5 km link road running direct to the A67 and a new roundabout close to Wilkinson's Plant Centre.

On 29 August 2022, the airport officially opened a new £2.5million cargo handling facility. The facility includes a purpose-built 21,000sq ft hangar with security screening technology, handling, freight-forwarding, customs clearage and storage. The facility can also be used for specialised charter flights for both air and road freight. Following the closure of Doncaster Sheffield Airport in November 2022, it is expected that some of their 10,000 tonnes of annual freight will now be handled by Teesside.

Teesside airport will be the first in the UK to scrap the 100ml limit on liquids in hand luggage with the installation of new scanning equipment known as a C3 Scanner.

Airlines and destinations
The following airlines operate regular scheduled flights to and from Teesside:

Other users
There are two flight schools located at the airport, AeroSchool and Eden Flight Training.

IAS Medical are an air ambulance operator who specialise in patient and organ transfer using Beech King Airs.

There are also three multinational defence contractors based on site, Draken Europe provide electronic countermeasure and aggressor training to the MoD using a fleet of Dassault Falcon 20 and Aero L-159E ALCA aircraft, and built a new hangar in 2022 to accommodate the latter. Serco operate their International Fire Training Centre, one of the largest in Europe, on the airports south side and Thales have their calibration and flight inspection subsidiary based with a Beech King Air and Diamond DA42 Twin Star.

US firm Willis Lease Finance Corporation subsidiary Willis Asset Management operate out of Hangar 2 at the airport and carry out maintenance and storage of a wide variety of commercial aircraft. Two further subsidiaries have since moved in, Willis Aviation Services are a ground handling company and Jet Centre by Willis now run the airports business aviation centre.

Two Boeing 727's owned by 2Excel Aviation and operating on behalf of Oil Spill Response Limited were relocated to Teesside Airport from Doncaster Sheffield Airport in November 2022. The aircraft are deployed anywhere in the world in the event of a major oil spill to spray dispersant material.

Non-aviation companies include FedEx Express, who operate from Hangar 1.

Traffic statistics

Passengers and movements
The airport saw strong growth from 1993 to 2006, when passenger numbers peaked at 917,963. Passenger numbers then declined steeply in the subsequent four years due to the financial crisis of 2007–2010. Passenger numbers continued to fall to a low of 130,911 (2017 figures), before showing small increases in 2018 and 2019, prior to the Covid pandemic. Freight volumes have slowly declined since 2000, to effectively zero tonnage by 2010.

With the airport back under public ownership in 2019, new holiday destinations have subsequently been announced. Combined with the "core" business flights currently operating out of the airport, the long-term hope is of pushing passenger numbers beyond 1.4m in the next decade by attracting a low cost airline.

Routes

Ground transport

Bus
Arriva North East operates a bus service (No.12) that runs from Hurworth and Darlington to the airport six times per day. The extension of the service to the urban centre of Teesside east of the airport however, has been withdrawn as a result of cancellation of Stockton Council financial support.

Car
The airport is situated off the A67 and is near the A1(M), A19 and A66 corridors. A significant upgrade to complete a fast link direct to the airport from the A66 was completed in 2008.

Rail
Currently, Dinsdale railway station, about 2 miles (3.2 km) away in the nearby village of Middleton St George, is the closest station with regular passenger services, as well as a direct bus link with the terminal.

As of April 2022, Teesside Airport railway station is temporarily closed. The station has always been sparsely served, receiving two trains per week until December 2017 when the service was reduced to just one train every Sunday. The airport is exploring the possibility of using more shuttle buses and "horizontal escalators" to boost patronage at the station in the future.

Taxi
Taxis are available directly outside the airport terminal.

References

External links

Airports in England
Transport in County Durham
Places in the Tees Valley
Airports in North East England